Tin Tun Naing is a Burmese activist and politician who currently serves as the acting union minister for the Ministry of Planning, Finance and Industry, Ministry of Investment and Foreign Economic Relations and Ministry of Commerce. He is also a member of House of Representatives for Seikkyi Kanaungto Township and of the Committee Representing Pyidaungsu Hluttaw.

Early life and education
He conferred his bachelor's degree in electronic engineering from Mandalay Institute of Technology (MIT) and completed Executive MBA program from Yangon Institute of Economics.

Political career
In the 2015 Myanmar general election, Tin Tun Naing contested in Seikkyi Kanaungto Township constituency for Pyithu Hluttaw, from National League for Democracy, and won a seat by 8,392 votes.

In the 2020 Myanmar general election, he was re-elected as a MP for Seikkyi Kanaungto Township but was not allowed to assume his seat due to the military coup.

On 5 February 2021, in the aftermath of 2021 Myanmar coup d'état, he became a member of the Committee Representing Pyidaungsu Hluttaw.

On 2 March 2021, he was appointed by CRPH as the acting union minister for the Ministry of Planning, Finance and Industry, the Ministry of Investment and Foreign Economic Relations and the Ministry of Commerce.

References

Living people
Burmese activists
National League for Democracy politicians
People from Mandalay Region
1971 births
21st-century Burmese politicians